Mi Son may refer to
Mỹ Sơn or Mi Son, cluster of abandoned Hindu temples located in what is today Central Vietnam
Mi Son, 2001 album by Mexican American singer Rick Trevino
"Mi Son", 1980s song by  Puerto Rico singer José Vega Santana for the band Haciendo Punto en Otro Son

See also
Mison, commune in the Alpes-de-Haute-Provence department in southeastern France
Mi-sun, Korean feminine given name also romanised Misŏn
Mi son mi son, 1999 album by Cuban group Conjunto Chappottín